Milan Spasojević (born 15 March 1950 in Niš) is a Serbian former triple jumper who competed in the 1972 Summer Olympics and in the 1980 Summer Olympics.

References

1950 births
Living people
Serbian male triple jumpers
Olympic athletes of Yugoslavia
Athletes (track and field) at the 1972 Summer Olympics
Athletes (track and field) at the 1980 Summer Olympics
Sportspeople from Niš
Mediterranean Games gold medalists for Yugoslavia
Mediterranean Games silver medalists for Yugoslavia
Mediterranean Games bronze medalists for Yugoslavia
Athletes (track and field) at the 1971 Mediterranean Games
Athletes (track and field) at the 1975 Mediterranean Games
Athletes (track and field) at the 1979 Mediterranean Games
Mediterranean Games medalists in athletics